Paprykarz is a Polish word that may refer to:

 Chicken paprikash, Hungarian stew
 Paprykarz szczeciński, Polish canned fish spread